The 60th annual Berlin International Film Festival was held from 11 to 21 February 2010, with Werner Herzog as President of the Jury. The opening film of the festival was Chinese director Wang Quan'an's romantic drama Apart Together, in competition, while the closing film is Japanese director Yoji Yamada's About Her Brother, which was screened out of competition. The Golden Bear went to Turkish film Bal directed by Semih Kaplanoğlu. A new record attendance was established with 282,000 sold tickets, according to the organizers. A restored version of Fritz Lang's Metropolis was also shown at the festival.

Jury

The following people were announced as being on the jury for the festival:

International jury
 Werner Herzog, director and screenwriter (Germany) - Jury President
 Francesca Comencini, director and screenwriter (Italy)
 Nuruddin Farah, writer (Somalia)
 Cornelia Froboess, actress and singer (Germany)
 José María Morales, producer (Spain)
 Yu Nan, actress (China)
 Renée Zellweger, actress (United States)

Best First Feature Award Jury
 Michael Verhoeven, actor, director and screenwriter (Germany)
 Ben Foster, actor (United States)
 Lorna Tee, producer (Malaysia)

International Short Film Jury
 Zita Carvalhosa, producer (Brazil)
 Max Dax, publisher and producer (Germany)
 Samm Haillay, producer (United Kingdom)

In competition 

The following films were selected in competition for the Golden Bear and Silver Bear awards:

Out of competition
The following films made their international debut by screening out of competition at the festival:

Key
{| class="wikitable" width="550" colspan="1"
| style="background:#FFDEAD;" align="center"| †
|Winner of the main award for best film in its section
|-
| colspan="2"| The opening and closing films are screened during the opening and closing ceremonies respectively.
|}

Awards

The following prizes were awarded by the Jury:

Golden Bear for Best Film: Bal by Semih Kaplanoğlu

Silver Bears:
 Jury Grand Prix: Eu cand vreau sa fluier, fluier by Florin Șerban
 Best Director: Roman Polanski for The Ghost Writer
 Best Actress: Shinobu Terajima for Caterpillar
 Best Actor: Grigoriy Dobrygin and Sergei Puskepalis for How I Ended This Summer (Kak ya provel etim letom)
 Best Script: Jin Na and Wang Quan'an for Apart Together (Tuan Yuan)
 Outstanding Artistic Contribution (Camera): Pavel Kostomarov for Kak ya provel etim letom
 Alfred Bauer Prize: Eu cand vreau sa fluier, fluier by Florin Șerban

Honorary Golden Bear
Wolfgang Kohlhaase
Hanna Schygulla

Crystal Bear in the Generation Kplus (Feature Length Film)
Echoes of the Rainbow (Shui Yuet Sun Tau)

Crystal Bear in the Generation 14plus (Feature Length Film)
Neukölln Unlimited

The Berlinale Camera
Yoji Yamada
Ulrich Gregor and Erika Gregor
Fine Art Foundry Noack

References

External links

Yearbook 2010 at berlinale.de
60th Berlin International Film Festival 2010
Berlin International Film Festival:2010  at Internet Movie Database

60
2010 film festivals
2010 festivals in Europe
2010 in Berlin
Berl